Tia & Tamera is an American reality television series that aired on the Style Network from August 8, 2011, until September 22, 2013. Originally titled Tia & Tamera Take 2, the series started off as a television special that aired on July 17, 2010. It was announced in February 2011 that the special was picked to series. Later, the series was changed to its current title and debuted on August 8, 2011, on the now defunct Style Network. In September 2011, Style Network renewed the show for a second season, which later premiered on June 11, 2012. Season 3 was announced on February 12, 2013, with it premiering on July 14, 2013. The third season concluded September 22, 2013, and was the last program to air on Style, which re-branded as Esquire Network the next day. Tia & Tamera began airing on E! starting October 15, 2013, along with former Style Network series Giuliana and Bill.

Tia and Tamera Mowry announced on December 30, 2013, that the series would not return for a fourth season. Tamera was a host on the daytime talk show The Real (2013-2020).  Tia starred in the sitcom Instant Mom.

Premise
The series goes inside the lives of celebrity identical twins Tia and Tamera Mowry as they balance their acting careers with major life transformations of marriage and motherhood.

Cast

Main

Tia Dashon Mowry

With her twin sister, Tamera, by her side, Tia became a teen TV star thanks to her work on the wildly popular comedy series Sister, Sister. She continued to act and produce while pursuing a psychology degree at Pepperdine University and starred in the hit series The Game. Other credits include Girlfriends and Double Wedding, which reunited her onscreen with Tamera. Tia married actor Cory Hardrict in April 2008; their first child, a son named Cree Taylor Hardrict, was born on June 28, 2011; a daughter, Cairo Tiahna Hardrict, was born on May 5, 2018 l

Tamera Mowry-Housley

With her twin sister, Tia, by her side, Tamera became a teen TV star thanks to her work on the wildly popular comedy series Sister, Sister. She continued to act and produce while pursuing a psychology degree at Pepperdine University. Other credits include Double Wedding (an onscreen reunion with Tia), Roommates, and Strong Medicine. Tamera married Fox News correspondent Adam Housley in May 2011. The couple confirmed that they were expecting their first child in April 2012. Tamera gave birth to a son named Aden John Tanner Housley on November 12, 2012. Tamera and Adam Housley welcomed their newest bundle of joy Ariah to the world on July 1, 2015. Mowry also served as a co-host on the daytime talk show The Real from 2013 until being released in 2020.

Supporting

 Cory Hardrict—Tia's husband
 Cree Hardrict—Tia and Cory's son
 Adam Housley—Tamera's husband
 Aden Housley—Tamera and Adam's son
 Jackée Harry—Tia and Tamera's former co-star on Sister, Sister
 Wendy Raquel Robinson—Tia's  co-star on The Game
 Andrea—Tamera's best friend
 Jerome—Tia and Tamera's cousin
 Carlos—Tia and Tamera's cousin
 Kam Horne—Tia's friend
 Amy Davidson—Tamera's friend
 Hosea Chanchez—Tia's co-star on The Game (Season 1)
 Keisha—Tia and Tamera's cousin (Season 2)

Episodes

Season 1 (2011)

Season 2 (2012–13)

Season 3 (2013)

Ratings
At the time, the series premiere was the most-watched series premiere for Style Network and the second most watched Style Network telecast ever in key demos. The episode averaged 1.5 million viewers for its combined two airings. The second episode climbed to new highs with 920,000 viewers and a 0.5 rating in adults 18–49 demo. The first season was also Style Network’s most-watched original series, at the time, by acquiring 775,000 total viewers. At the end of July 2012, Tia & Tamera averaged 450,000 total viewers during its second season. The third season premiered with 491,000 viewers.

References

2010s American reality television series
2011 American television series debuts
2013 American television series endings
African-American reality television series
English-language television shows
Style Network original programming
Television series by Good Clean Fun (production company)